Yanta is a village situated in Rashaya District, Beqaa Governorate, Lebanon,  from Beirut. It is located close to the Syrian border north of Kfar Qouq.

The name is variously claimed to mean "God sows" or "God the sower" in Semitic, "white dove" in Syriac and "elevation" in Arabic. It has been noted that a special type of yellow marl (lake sediments) has been noticed in Yanta and the surrounding area dated to the Oxfordian. In 2001 and 2002, archaeological studies were carried out at Kamid al lawz near Yanta that unearthed a large amount of Ancient Greek pottery.

Roman temple
There are ruins of an impressively sized and positioned Roman temple in the area that is presumed to have been built on the site of a forerunning Semitic temple. The ruins lie on either side of the road and are sparse but retain some upright stones. Around the site are remnants of ancient habitation and tombs.

References

External links
 Ikema guide to Lebanon - Yanta
 Localiban Entry on Yanta
 The Lebanon Mountain Trail Project
 American University of Beirut - Image of Yanta Roman Temple 1
 American University of Beirut - Image of Yanta Roman Temple 2

Populated places in Rashaya District
Archaeological sites in Lebanon
Ancient Roman temples